Nyaruyoba is an administrative ward within Muhambwe Constituency in Kibondo District of Kigoma Region in Tanzania. In 2016 the Tanzania National Bureau of Statistics report there were 15,499 people in the ward. Prior to 2014 Nyaruyoba was a village within the Busagara Ward.

Villages / neighborhoods 
The ward has 15 hamlets.

 Bitama
 Bugolebuke
 Busoro
 Itale
 Kalutale
 Kumkuyu
 Mgazi mmoja
 Mihama
 Msarasi
 Muragone
 Nyakiyona
 Nyamafyisi
 Nyaruyoba
 Nyenyeri
 Nyesato

References

Kibondo District
Wards of Kigoma Region
Constituencies of Tanzania